Christian Wein (born 6 June 1979) is a German field hockey player. He competed in the men's tournament at the 2000 Summer Olympics.

References

External links
 

1979 births
Living people
German male field hockey players
Olympic field hockey players of Germany
Field hockey players at the 2000 Summer Olympics
Field hockey players from Barcelona
2002 Men's Hockey World Cup players
20th-century German people